Buckshot LeFonque is the eponymous debut album of Branford Marsalis's jazz/hip-hop/rock group. Creating a new hybrid sound, It peaked at number 38 on the Heatseekers Billboard chart and number 94 on the R&B Albums chart.

In his AllMusic review, Richard Ginell calls the album "a breakthrough… a marvelously playful and, above all, musical fusion of the old jazz verities and newer currents swirling around the 1990s." David Hajdu's Entertainment Weekly review was more harsh, saying, "The gimmick betrays a project of iffy conviction" and calling the project "old-fashioned," "uninspired," and "all too serious." And People wrote, "Buckshot Lefonque goes from being a cool idea to be-coming cool music only when Branford and crew let hip hop's noise erupt."

Track listing

Personnel

 Branford Marsalis – Saxophones
 Roy Hargrove – Trumpet
 David Barry – Guitar
 DJ Premier – Drum Programming
 Matt Finders – Trombone
 Mino Cinelu – Percussion
 Delfeayo Marsalis – Trombone, Piano
 Kenny Kirkland – Piano
 Robert Hurst – Bass
 Vicki Randle – Percussion
 Maya Angelou – Vocal
 Kevin Eubanks – Guitar
 Ray Fuller – Guitar
 Nils Lofgren – Guitar
 Frank McComb – Vocal
 Greg Phillinganes – Keyboards, Moog Bass
 Jeff "Tain" Watts – Drums
 Blackheart – Vocal
 Darryl Jones – Bass
 Tammy Townsend – Vocal
 Larry Kimpel – Bass
 Chuck Morris – Drums
 Albert Collins – Guitar
 Victor Wooten - Bass

Charts

References

External links
 Branford Marsalis' website

1994 albums
Branford Marsalis albums
Albums produced by DJ Premier